960 Birgit (prov. designation:  or ) is a background asteroid, approximately  in diameter, located in the Florian region of the inner asteroid belt. It was discovered on 1 October 1921, by astronomer Karl Reinmuth at the Heidelberg Observatory in southern Germany. The possibly S-type asteroid has a rotation period of 8.9 hours. It was named after Birgit Asplind, daughter of Swedish astronomer Bror Asplind (1890–1954).

Orbit and classification 

Located in the Florian region, Birgit is a non-family asteroid of the main belt's background population when applying the hierarchical clustering method to its proper orbital elements. It orbits the Sun in the inner asteroid belt at a distance of 1.9–2.6 AU once every 3 years and 4 months (1,232 days; semi-major axis of 2.25 AU). Its orbit has an eccentricity of 0.17 and an inclination of 3° with respect to the ecliptic. The body's observation arc begins at Heidelberg on 25 October 1925, three weeks after its official discovery observation.

Naming 

This minor planet was named after Birgit Asplind, daughter of Swedish astronomer Bror Ansgar Asplind (1890–1954). Asteroids 958 Asplinda, 959 Arne and 961 Gunnie are named after him and his other two children, respectively. The  was mentioned in The Names of the Minor Planets by Paul Herget in 1955.

Physical characteristics 

Based on its determined albedo, Birgit is an assumed S-type asteroid. The albedo determined by the Wide-field Infrared Survey Explorer (WISE) for this asteroid agrees with that assumption (see below).

Rotation period 

In February 2007, a rotational lightcurve of Birgit was obtained from photometric observations by Agnieszka Kryszczyńska at Poznań Observatory, Poland, and international collaborators. Lightcurve analysis gave a rotation period of  hours with a brightness variation of  magnitude. The result supersedes observations by Federico Manzini, Roberto Crippa, and Pierre Antonini from August 2005, who determined a poorly rated period of  hours with an amplitude of  magnitude.

Diameter and albedo 

The Collaborative Asteroid Lightcurve Link assumes a standard albedo for a stony asteroid of 0.20 and calculates a diameter of 9.40 kilometers based on an absolute magnitude of 12.5.

Notes

References

External links 
 Lightcurve Database Query (LCDB), at www.minorplanet.info
 Dictionary of Minor Planet Names, Google books
 Asteroids and comets rotation curves, CdR – Geneva Observatory, Raoul Behrend
 Discovery Circumstances: Numbered Minor Planets (1)-(5000) – Minor Planet Center
 
 

000960
Discoveries by Karl Wilhelm Reinmuth
Named minor planets
19211001